Loral Ashley O'Hara (born May 3, 1983) is an American engineer and NASA astronaut.

Early life and education
Loral Ashley O'Hara was born on May 3, 1983, in Houston, Texas, to Cindy and Steve O'Hara.  She grew up in Sugar Land, Texas, where she attended Clements High School.  She earned a Bachelor of Science degree in aerospace engineering from the University of Kansas in 2005, and a Master of Science in aeronautics and astronautics from Purdue University in 2009.  While she was a student, O'Hara participated in the KC-135 Reduced Gravity Student Flight Opportunities Program.

Engineering career
Prior to completing her Master of Science degree, O'Hara worked for Rocketplane Limited in Oklahoma City, Oklahoma. In 2009, O'Hara began working at the Woods Hole Oceanographic Institution. She has participated in upgrades to the submersible DSV Alvin, and has worked as an engineer and data processor for the remotively-operated vehicle Jason.

NASA career
O'Hara has previously participated in the NASA Academy at Goddard Space Flight Center, and completed an internship at Jet Propulsion Laboratory.  In June 2017, she was selected as an astronaut candidate, and began training in August. On January 10, 2020, she graduated from NASA's astronaut candidate program to its astronaut corps, and is now eligible for spaceflight.

On July 15, 2022, NASA announced she will fly on board Soyuz MS-23, as part of Expedition 68.  However, following the on-orbit problems with the Soyuz MS-22 spacecraft that necessitated repurposing of the Soyuz MS-23 spacecraft, O'Hara's crew shifted to the next Soyuz, Soyuz MS-24.

Personal life
O'Hara is a private pilot, certified emergency medical technician, and a wilderness first responder.  She enjoys traveling, whitewater rafting, surfing, diving, flying, sailing, skiing, hiking, caving, reading, and painting.

Awards and honors
In 2008, O'Hara was awarded a National Science Foundation Graduate Research Fellowship.  In 2015, she was an invited speaker at TEDx New Bedford.

References

Living people
American astronauts
People from Houston
University of Kansas alumni
Purdue University School of Aeronautics and Astronautics alumni
People from Sugar Land, Texas
Women astronauts
American women engineers
21st-century women engineers
1983 births
21st-century American women